WestCAT is a public transportation service in western Contra Costa County (north of Oakland, CA). It is a service of the Western Contra Costa Transit Authority.

The Western Contra Costa County Transit (WestCAT) was established in August 1977 as a Joint Exercise of Powers Agreement between Contra Costa County and the cities of Hercules and Pinole.  It was created with the purpose of owning, operating and administering a public transportation system serving the area between the Richmond/El Sobrante border to the west and the Al Zampa Memorial Bridge to the east.  WestCAT is governed by a 7-member Board of Directors and supported by professional staff of seven.  The two cities of Pinole and Hercules are each represented by two board members, while the unincorporated communities of Crockett, Rodeo, and Montalvin Manor each have one representative, appointed by the Contra Costa Board of Supervisors.

WestCAT's fleet started out with shuttle vans, and then using buses made by El Dorado National and Thomas Built Buses. Now, WestCAT runs an almost all Gillig fleet, ranging from 19 Gillig Phantoms, to 18 Gillig Low Floors.  WestCAT also has 5 Motor Coach Industries (MCI) over-the-road coaches for use on the LYNX.  In addition, WestCAT has 10 Ford E-450 Paratransit vans, and 2 Toyota Camry hybrid electric sedans used for Dial-A-Ride.

Fixed-route service
As of September 2013, WestCAT provides a network of local and express bus routes throughout western Contra Costa County. In addition, WestCAT operates regional service between Martinez (Route 30Z) and the Hercules Transit Center and between the Hercules Transit Center and Contra Costa College (Route C3). The (Local) routes are  10, 11, 12, 15, 16, 17, 18, and 19. Also (Express) JX, JL/JR (referred to as the "J" by most riders, the "L" designates via Lakeside Drive, and the "R" designates via Richmond Parkway), JPX (serves Pinole Valley residents wanting to go to the Hercules Transit Center or BART).  Also, WestCAT operates transbay service between the Hercules Transit Center and the Salesforce Transit Center in San Francisco called the LYNX with stops in the Rodeo Park and Ride located on Willow Avenue, North Shore Business Park near Bio-Rad, the Victoria by the Bay neighborhood in Hercules and the Hercules Transit Center. From the Hercules Transit Center the line then goes nonstop to San Francisco via the High Occupancy Vehicle (HOV) lanes on I-80. WestCAT currently offers free Wi-Fi service on the LYNX line.

Major transfer points for the majority of WestCAT and other agency's routes include:
 Hercules Transit Center in Hercules
 Hilltop Mall Shopping Center in Richmond
 Richmond Parkway Transit Center in Richmond
 El Cerrito del Norte BART in El Cerrito
 Martinez Amtrak Station in Martinez
 Salesforce Transit Center in San Francisco

Routes

 [JPX] Richmond Parkway Transit Center service only during midday from 9:40am to 2:30pm, route also serves Hercules Transit Center.
 [J] JR Via Richmond Parkway and Blume Drive and JL Via Lakeside Drive.
[Lynx] Route serves Hercules Transit Center, and most peak period services also serve Bio-Rad, all terminating at Victoria By The Bay. Also operates midday (non-commute) trips between San Francisco and Hercules Transit Center, and it does not serve Bio-Rad or Victoria By The Bay.
 [Early Bird] These routes, which replace early-morning BART service, have a limited number of weekday trips.

Service Area

WestCAT provides service to the communities of:

 Bayview
 Crockett
 El Cerrito
 Hercules

 Martinez
 Montalvin Manor
 Pinole

 Port Costa
 Richmond
 Rodeo

 San Francisco
 San Pablo
 Tara Hills

The local transportation demand management organization 511 Contra Costa also provides information for intermodal transfers throughout Contra Costa County, and works closely with WestCAT to help transit users make regional connections beyond their immediate service area.

References

External links
 WestCAT

Public transportation in Contra Costa County, California
Bus transportation in California
1977 establishments in California
Transit agencies in California